Social constructionism, a branch of sociology, queries commonly held views on the nature of reality, touching on themes of normality and abnormality within the context of power and oppression in societal structures.

The concept of a social construction of schizophrenia, within a social construction of health and illness notary form, denotes that the label of schizophrenia is one that has been socially constructed through ideological systems, none of which are truly empirical especially as currently there is no definitive evidence as to the aetiology of schizophrenia.

Introduction
In 1966, Berger and Luckman coined the term social constructionism in their work The Social Construction of Reality. In summary it examines the basis of fact and truth / knowledge within culture. While some truths such as "fire is hot" are universally agreed as objective, many others considered 'fact' are the result of a common subjective experience and the subsequent validation of that.

Walker has argued that psychiatric diagnoses are nothing but linguistic abstractions. He has criticized the DSM-IV's poor reliability and postulated that terms like schizophrenia and mental illness only exist by consensus and persist by convention. Further he argues that the pathologizing language which persists in the medical model of disability is unhelpful in working towards a recovery model.

Other notable practitioners and authors within the humanistic tradition that have viewed schizophrenia as a social construction include psychiatrist Thomas Szasz, Joseph Berke, R.D. Laing, Erich Fromm and Mary Barnes. Szasz viewed the diagnoses as a fabrication that is borderline abusive in terms of treatment. Szasz has protested against the taxonomic classifications of mental illness and reification of these as science, and has long argued against institutionalisation as a fundamental deprivation of liberty. In Berke's and Barnes's book two accounts of a journey through madness, Berke explores themes of psychosis as an enriching experience. Berke argues that the invalidation of schizophrenic experiences labelled 'sick or mad' is a uniquely western standpoint insofar as dream states and altered perception are not considered valid modes of interpolation of the truth within westernised culture.

Laing (1964) commented "the mad things done and said by the schizophrenic will remain essentially a closed book if one does not understand their existential context".

Noll (1983) has explored the links between shamanism and schizophrenia, testing the research evidence on shamanism against the DSM-III diagnostic criterion. Though he draws comparisons between the two states of mind in terms of the phenomenon experienced, he draws out important differences between shamanic and schizophrenic states, notably that many people on the schizophrenic spectrum do not voluntarily enter an altered state of consciousness whereas research into shamanism unilaterally shows that shamanic states are induced and controlled voluntarily by the shaman, who ultimately maintains a healthy world view between a base line level of consciousness and an altered state of consciousness. He concludes that differences between schizophrenic and shamanic states such as 'volition', mean that the DSM-III cannot be used to define shamanism as the same state as schizophrenia. Robert Sapolsky has theorized that shamanism is practiced by schizotypal individuals rather than those with schizophrenia.

Themes

Philosophy
Themes in social constructionism draw on various philosophies centred around the differences between objective reality or that which is known or absolute and subjective reality or that which is observed by the knower. In Schizophrenia: A scientific delusion, Mary Boyle explores 'schizophrenia and its assumptions as truths or knowledges which are socially produced and managed'.

Linguistics
Michael Walker examines the social construction of mental illness and its implications for the recovery model. He is critical of the user becoming defined by the definer, such as if you go for behavioural therapy you come out with a perspective of rewards and punishments, etc.:

He is critical of a deficit-based vocabulary:

Power and control

Post Structuralist Jürgen Habermas examines questions of identity in the concept of societal integration and discusses how change occurs when there is a legitimation crisis. 
It assists the understanding of the social construction of schizophrenia and other illness in also understanding forces that shape power imbalances in aetiologies. Phil Brown in Naming and Framing: The social construction of diagnosis and illness points out how professionals were very slow and unwilling to accept the diagnosis of tardive dyskinesia, despite many research indicated warnings on it, as it was caused by prescription drugs that had been plaudited to be successful in treatment of the associated condition of psychoses. Market forces in pharmacology and/or cultural embarrassment can shape the rate at which society adapts to include new frameworks such as those demonstrated in the Diagnostic and Statistical Manual of Mental Disorders.

Conrad writes on medicalization and social control. He looks at the process of science and medicalization. Science is heralded as the new religion in terms of ideological power and Conrad describes how medicalization can be used to police morals.

In "The social construction of illness, key insights and policy implications", Conrad and Barker trace the history of the construction of illness from symbolic interactionists and medical sociologists and examine how society reacts in situations to the distinctions such as the construction of gender from sex and the construction of illness from disease:

They conclude that in an information age, new social groupings emerging may challenge the social constructions of illness and force policy changes.

Foucault examines power systems that incur on the operation of institutions and professionals:

The UK Parliament, in a key issues statement for 2015, references a 1957 statement by the Royal Commission, but queries its impact some 60 years later:

Certain oppressions in the UK were removed by the Mental Health (Discrimination) Act 2013

The self and identity
Research directions here are on the importance of experiential narrative within psychiatric dialogue. Some research is critical of modern psychiatric adoption of an 'empiricist-behavioural approach' within the DSM. Nelson, Yung, Bechdolf and McGorry examine this in context of a phenomenological approach to the understanding of ultra high risk psychiatric disorders. They criticize psychiatric research that addresses subjectivity:

'Mad Studies' is an emerging field of study wherein the user movement seeks to reclaim words such as mad and loony and redefine how psychiatry envisages the concept of madness, refuting where user experiences have been co-opted into psychiatric definitions. Mad Studies provides a construct whereby people with 'negative' mental health seek to be identified as part of the neuro-diversity of the human race. 

A simple way of looking at it is a slogan adopted by self-advocates 'nothing about us, without us', encouraging educators to co-teach with people who have lived experience of mental illness or distress. 
A key concept in this ontology is the idea of sanism – a seventh structural oppression to go alongside those associated with race, gender, disability, age, class, and species. It is also defined as Mentalism (discrimination) :

Movement to reconstruct schizophrenia

Alternative Perception is one of several names suggested by the schizophrenic user movement to replace the term schizophrenia which is on a spectrum of psychotic disorders and is considered to be outmoded by many consumers of services. Several academic authorities, notably Professor Marius Romme founder and principal theorist for the Hearing Voices Movement provide a rationale for the abandonment of this label. A symposium of some of the leading notions in this field from consumers of services and academics concluded:
Some scholars of psychology have expressed a need for schizophrenia to be socially reconstructed, including Anne Cooke and Peter Kinderman, who coauthored a paper on the subject.

Historical construction of schizophrenia

The terms schizophrenia and autism originated from the works of Eugen Bleuler (1857–1939) as different aspects of the same diagnostic condition. Bleuler was a contemporary of Sigmund Freud and Carl Jung. Prior to Bleuler's interventions schizophrenia was referred to as dementia praecox (early insanity) and perceived as a single disorder. Schizophrenia is sometimes also referred to as hebephrenia, stemming in etymology from the Greek god Hebe who was associated with adolescence and as it was thought the onset of schizophrenia came at adolescence. It is generally acknowledged that schizophrenia can have early onset and late onset.

"He first advanced the term schizophrenia in 1908 in a paper based on a study of 647 Burghölzli patients. He then expanded on his paper of 1908 in  Bleuler is credited with the introduction of two concepts fundamental to the analysis of schizophrenia: autism, denoting the loss of contact with reality, frequently through indulgence in bizarre fantasy; and ambivalence, denoting the coexistence of mutually exclusive contradictions within the psyche."

Schizophrenia in America is a medical diagnostic category, which in the 1970s was primarily termed differentiated and undifferentiated schizophrenia; international leaders such as R.D. Laing in Europe offered professional expertise in serving this population group. In the context of community mental health services, the broad term mental health also referred to individuals who may have this diagnosis, which may or may not be considered to be valid or relevant. The word schizophrenia is often associated with a "major mental breakdown" in common parlance which may result in the need for psychotherapy, mental health counseling, person-centered therapy, or community support services.

Charities committed to changing public perception
Charities that disagree with the notion of the schizophrenia label in the U.K. include Mind (charity) and Rethink. Mind state on their website "Because of differences of opinion about schizophrenia, it's not easy to identify what might cause it." Mind have previously published an explanatory leaflet, prefaced by Michael Palin that gives a definition of schizophrenia as people "who think outside the normal range of human experience". The National Alliance on Mental Illness says:

Science of schizophrenia and comorbid conditions

Whilst the definitive cause(s) of schizophrenia remain unknown, research has indicated strong links between genetic make-up, social predisposing factors or stressors and environmental conditions in relation to the development and onset of schizophrenia and other conditions. International geneticists are working towards identifying a gene for Schizophrenia, combined efforts are at the SzGene database. In the course of this research geneticists have identified specific genes or copy number variants or alleles that may explain the comorbidity of various conditions.

Genetic links between comorbid conditions

Links between autism and schizophrenia have been studied. From clinical observation, both conditions cause a disruption in normative social functioning which may be mild or severe depending on the individual's position within the spectrum. Social cognition is under-developed in autism and highly developed in psychoses. Four genetic loci are diametrically opposed in terms of diagnoses of autism and schizophrenia, with corresponding deletions for one condition or duplications for the other. Researchers examining chromosome 16 (16p11.2) identified a heredity area on the short arm of human chromosome 16 (16p11.2) which contains microduplication and microdeletion of genome variation. Microduplication of hereditary factors in this heredity area increased the individual's risk of schizophrenia more than 8–14-fold and of autism over 20-fold. A corresponding microdeletion instead of microduplication in the area affected the risk of autism only, but not of schizophrenia. A recent study of de novo mutations - new mutations in people with both autism and schizophrenia spectrum conditions - concluded that schizophrenia and autism are due to "errors" during early organogenesis.

The National Institute of Mental Health reported on 8 December 2009 that in spring 2010, major databases on autism research would be joined up to facilitate further research.

Genetic allelles
Other genetic analysis examines the role of alleles. One study ascribes links between schizophrenia and bipolar disorder by studying a total group of 6909 Europeans, both diagnosed and undiagnosed. Another study suggests that genetic markers may be very dissimilar among different lineages of DNA in people of different cultures, making an international commonality in genetics as a precipitating factor in schizophrenia difficult to identify.

Social factors
A study published in The Guardian, reported on 9 December 2009, ascribes the onset of the condition to social factors. The authors of the study, which compared 500 patients with mental health problems with other ethnic groups and a control group of 350 people, claim there is an epidemic of schizophrenia amongst the Afro-Caribbean community. They refute the argument that racism may contribute to more diagnoses from psychiatrists of schizophrenia amongst members of the Afro Caribbean community and ascribe more value to deprivation and social isolation as triggering factors in those with a propensity towards schizotype personalities.

Chemical and environmental factors

Various studies have indicated chemical precipitating factors in the development of autism or schizophrenia and also suggested that environmental factors such as toxins in the air may have precipitated a rise in the number of children born with autism. Ploeger discovered that pre-natal prescribed softenon in the 1960s and '70s led to an increase of children born with autism by 4% as opposed to a usual figure of 0.1%. Sodium valproate, a drug used as an anti-epileptic and as a mood stabilizer, increased the chance of children being born with autism sevenfold. The active component of cannabis (THC) is thought by some to increase the chances of onset of schizophrenia by 2.6 times in its skunk preparation. There is no publicly available research on commonalities between these chemicals that may trigger the on/off switches in neuro-receptors linked to genes responsible for conditions on the autistic or schizophrenic spectrum.

Criticism of genetics

Critique in terms of current genetic research is that there are many candidates for copy number variants that may predispose a likelihood of developing schizophrenia but current research is flawed by both the sample sizes available for analysis by condition population and by an incomplete understanding of 'double whammies' where one allele affects another.
 This has also been referred to as genetic 'dark matter' with the notion that many rare mutations have not yet been discovered.

Evolution

Links between autism and schizophrenia have been studied (as above). The implications are both conditions are part of the same spectrum. From clinical observation, both conditions cause a disruption in normative social functioning which may be mild or severe depending on the individual's position within the spectrum. Simon Fraser University researcher Crespi has examined how social cognition is under developed in autism and highly developed in Psychoses and outlines how the relationship between autism and schizophrenic spectrum is not one that has been explored in detail in the latter part of the 20th century. His research hypothesises that the genetic marker for both conditions may lie in the same location. His team have identified four loci that are diametrically opposed in terms of diagnoses of autism and schizophrenia with corresponding deletions for one condition or duplications for the other:

Professor Tim Crow, from the University Department of Psychiatry at Oxford University, has long argued that schizophrenia as a condition came about as a result of natural selection. He has argued that schizophrenia is a by-product of the development of language, resulting from an evolutionary change approximately 150,000 years ago, that persisted due to sexual selection. However, conversely to study in polygenes or multiple allele combinations, he maintains that the answer lies in:

Immunology and schizophrenia
A strand of research into schizophrenia is to investigate the links between viruses that attack the immune system such as herpes and the onset of schizophrenia. Researchers in this field are hopeful that this connection may provide a cure for schizophrenia within the next 20 years.

Muller proposes that the vulnerability-stress model of analysis of schizophrenia should become the vulnerability-stress-inflammation model:

Research shows that viral infections of the immune system can dramatically increase the frequency of the onset of schizophrenia.

Global moves to change the construction of schizophrenia

Netherlands
In the Netherlands alternative proposals for the name schizophrenia include dysfunctional perception syndrome and Salience Syndrome :

From a social model of disability perspective, this interlinks:

Japan
In Japan:

The Japanese society of psychiatry and neurology report:

South Korea
In South Korea, schizophrenia has been renamed to 'Attunement Disorder':

See also

 Rosenhan experiment
 Sluggish schizophrenia
 Elvin Semrad

References

External links
 GeneReview/NCBI/NIH/UW entry on 16p11.2 Deletion Syndrome

Construction of schizophrenia
Schizophrenia
Schizophrenia